Life of Leisure is an extended play (EP) by American singer-songwriter and record producer Washed Out.
Released on September 8, 2009, by Mexican Summer. It is the second EP that the artist has produced, the first being High Times the same year.

Track listing

Samples
 "Get Up" contains a sample of "Got To Get Up" (1983) by Change
 "New Theory" contains a sample of "Feel It" (1980) by Revelation
 "Hold Out" contains a sample of "West Coast Drive" (1975) by V.I.P. Connection
 "Feel It All Around" contains a sample of "I Want You" (1983) by Gary Low

Reception

Pitchfork Media's Marc Hogan gave the EP an 8 and stated that "Washed Out, the solo project of Georgia (via South Carolina) multi-instrumentalist Ernest Greene, fits in almost too well with the balmy lo-fi synth atmospherics of peers like Neon Indian, Toro Y Moi, Small Black, the higher-fi jj, or the darker, heavier SALEM, as well as the more guitar-based Real Estate, Best Coast, and Pearl Harbour. Washed Out's debut Life of Leisure EP isn't at the top of its class, but Greene so far is one of this fledgling aesthetic's most gifted students."

The song "Feel It All Around" was released as a single, which became a definitive song of the chillwave genre and appeared on many best-of-2009 lists, including those from Pitchfork and NME.

In popular culture
"Feel It All Around" is featured in a Proenza Schouler campaign video for the Fall of 2010.
"Feel It All Around" is also featured as the opening theme for TV series Portlandia on IFC.

See also
2009 in music
Indie pop
Vaporwave

References

External links
Official playlist on YouTube

2009 EPs
Washed Out albums
Mexican Summer albums
Chillwave albums